San Juan Sharks is a Puerto Rican soccer team who plays in San Juan.  They play in the 2nd Division of the Puerto Rico Soccer League.

2008 season
The team finished the season with a record of 7-0-0.  They had an incredible 47 goals and allowed 0 goals in the 7 matches they played.

References

Puerto Rico Soccer League 2nd Division
Football clubs in Puerto Rico